Nakajima Planning Co.,Ltd, racing as Nakajima Racing, is a Super Formula and Super GT team organized and founded by Satoru Nakajima in 1983. The team has fielded four championship winners in the Formula Nippon racing series: Tom Coronel, Toranosuke Takagi, Ralph Firman and Loïc Duval. The organization races exclusively in Japan, although the drivers have different nationalities, and competes almost exclusively with Honda or Mugen based cars/engines.

Drivers and veteran drivers
 Tom Coronel
 Loïc Duval
 Ralph Firman
 Paolo Barilla
 Takashi Kogure
 André Lotterer
 Tsugio Matsuda
 Hidetoshi Mitsusada
 Hideki Mutoh
 Toranosuke Takagi
 Naoki Yamamoto
 Daisuke Nakajima
 Bertrand Baguette
 Kosuke Matsuura

Complete JGTC Results 
(key) (Races in bold indicate pole position) (Races in italics indicate fastest lap)

Complete Super GT results
(key) (Races in bold indicate pole position) (Races in italics indicate fastest lap)

‡ Half points awarded as less than 75% of race distance was completed.
* Season still in progress.

References

Formula Nippon teams
Super Formula teams
Japanese Formula 3 Championship teams
Japanese auto racing teams
Super GT teams
Honda in motorsport
Auto racing teams established in 1983
1983 establishments in Japan